The 2023 Boise State Broncos football team represent Boise State University as a member of the Mountain West Conference during the 2023 NCAA Division I FBS football season. They are led by head coach Andy Avalos, who was coaching his third season with the team. The Broncos played their home games at Albertsons Stadium in Boise, Idaho.

Schedule

Coaching staff

 

 Support staff
 Vincent Johnson III – Offensive Graduate Assistant
 Keith Price – Offensive Graduate Assistant 
 Keanu Yamamoto – Defensive Graduate Assistant 
 Jason Cverko – Director of Recruiting Operations 
 Joel Schneider –  Director of Football
 Lou Major – Director of Football External Relations 
 Jalyn Baker – Assistant Director of Sports Performance 
 Brandon Pietrzyk – Assistant Director of Sports Performance 
 Lucas White – Assistant Director of Sports Performance 
 Kiyoshi Harris – Director of Recruiting Relations 
 Dontrae Cooper – Recruiting Assistant 
 Brooke Pahukoa – Assistant Director of Football 
 Calin Criner – Defensive Coaching Assistant 
 Taylor Kolste – Offensive Coaching Assistant

Transfers

Outgoing
Jacob Golden, OL, transferred to New Mexico State
Sam Vidlak, QB, transferred to Montana
Gavin Wale, P, transferred to BYU
Russell Corrigan, TE
Elelyon Noa, RB
Isiah Bagnah, DE, transferred to BYU
Hank Bachmeier, QB, transferred to Louisiana Tech
Andy Nwaoko, DE
Isaiah Bradford, DB, transferred to BYU
Rejhan Tatum, LB
Dallas Holiday, OL, transferred to Portland State
Deven Wright, DE, transferred to Texas State
Will Ferrin, K, transferred to BYU
Tyneil Hopper, TE, transferred to Michigan State
Taequan Tyler, RB
Roman Kafentzis, DB
Jalen Richmond, WR, transferred to Northern Arizona
Casey Kline, DE/TE, transferred to Central Oklahoma

Incoming
Kivon Wright, DE, transferred from Boston College
Titus Toler, DB, transferred from Wisconsin
Sheldon Newton, DT, transferred from Northern Arizona
Chase Penry, WR, transferred from Colorado
Tyler Wegis, DE, transferred from Utah
Milo Lopez, DB, transferred from Cerritos College
A’Marion McCoy, DB, transferred from Laney College

References

Boise State
Boise State Broncos football seasons
Boise State Broncos football